Joe Meyers is an American former professional tennis player.

Meyers, who grew up in Fremont, California, received a full tennis scholarship to San Jose State College.

Following his college career he competed on the professional tour and reached a career high ranking of 163 in the world. His best performance came at the 1982 Australian Open, where he had a first round win over a former finalist John Lloyd, then took Australia's John Fitzgerald to five sets in a second round loss.

References

External links
 
 

Year of birth missing (living people)
Living people
American male tennis players
San Jose State Spartans men's tennis players
Tennis people from California
People from Fremont, California